The Huraa Dynasty was the sixth royal dynasty to rule over the Sultanate of Maldives from 1757 to 1965. It was founded by Sultan al-Ghazi Hasan 'Izz ud-din.

Rulers
List of Huraa Sultans:
Sultan al-Ghazi Hasan 'Izz ud-din (1757–1766 Sultan in absentia until the return of Dhiyamigili heir Giyath al-Din during Dhiyamigili Dynasty )
Sultan Muhammad Shams ud-din Iskandar II (1773–1774 )
Sultan Muhammad Mu'iz ud-din Iskander (1774–1779)
Hassan Nooraddeen I (1779–1799)
Muhammad Mueenuddeen I (1799–1835)
Muhammad Imaaduddeen IV (1835–1882)
Ibrahim Nooraddeen (1882–1886)
Muhammad Mueenuddeen II (1886–1888)
Ibrahim Nooraddeen (1888–1892) (second time)
Muhammad Imaaduddeen V (1892–1893)
Muhammad Shamsuddeen III (1893)
Haajee Imaaduddeen (1893–1902)
Muhammad Shamsuddeen III (1902–1934) (second time)
Hassan Nooraddeen Iskandar II (1934–1943)
Abdul Majeed Didi (1943–1952)
Republic (1952–1954)
Muhammad Fareed Didi (1954–1968)
Republic declared in 1968

Heads of the Huraa dynasty since 1968, who did not rule as sultans:
Muhammad Fareed Didi (1968–1969)
Ibrahim Fareed Didi (1969)

References

See also
List of Sultans of the Maldives
List of Sunni Muslim dynasties

Maldivian dynasties